Events in the year 1894 in Iceland.

Incumbents 

 Monarch: Christian IX
 Minister for Iceland: Johannes Nellemann

Events 

 Hið íslenska kvenfélag is founded in Reykjavík.
 Serfdom (Vistarband) is abolished in Iceland.
 Auðkúlukirkja is constructed at the Svínavatn lake, North Iceland.

References 

 
1890s in Iceland
Years of the 19th century in Iceland
Iceland
Iceland